The Ministry of Agriculture, Livestock and Fisheries or simply the Ministry of Agriculture (MOA or MoA) is a government ministry of Kenya. Its head office is in the Kilimo House in Nairobi.

List of Ministers of Agriculture
Michael Blundell (1955–1959)
Bruce Mackenzie (1959–1961)
Michael Blundell (1961–1962)
 Bruce Mackenzie (1963–1970)*
 Agriculture and Animal Husbandry (1965 Reappointment)
 Agriculture and Animal Husbandry (1966 Reappointment)
 Jeremiah J.M. Nyagah (1971–1979)

 Gilbert Kabere M'mbijiwe (1980–1982)
 Munyua Waiyaki (1982–1984)
 William Odongo Omamo (1984–1987)
 Elijah Mwangale (1987–1992)
 Simeon Nyachae (1993–1996)
 Darius Msagha Mbela (1997)
 Musalia Mudavadi (1998)
 Christopher Obure (1999–2001)
 Bonaya Godana (2001–2002)
 Kipruto Rono Arap Kirwa (2003–2007)
 William Ruto (2008–2010)
 Sally Kosgei (2010–2013)
 Felix Koskei (2013–2014)
 Willy Bett (2014–2017)
 Mwangi Kiunjuri (2017–2019)
 Peter Munya (2019–present)

Agencies
 Kenya Agricultural & Livestock Research Organization (KALRO)

See also

Agriculture in Kenya
 Coffee Industry of Kenya
 Poultry farming in Kenya
 Tea Production in Kenya
Kenya
Ministry of Foreign Affairs (Kenya)
Heads of State of Kenya
Heads of Government of Kenya
Vice-Presidents of Kenya
Colonial Heads of Kenya
Lists of office-holders

References

External links
 Ministry of Agriculture

Politics of Kenya

Agriculture ministries
Agricultural organisations based in Kenya